It Can Happen Here: Authoritarian Peril in the Age of Bush (2007) is a nonfiction book written by liberal writer and commentator Joe Conason.

2007 non-fiction books
Books about politics of the United States
Conason discusses what he sees as a trend towards authoritarianism during the administration of US President George W. Bush, focusing on manipulation of intelligence and public opinion surrounding the Iraq War, disregard of national and international law (the NSA warrantless wiretapping controversy and signing statements are used as examples), the increased mix of big business and government, and more.  The title comes from Sinclair Lewis' novel It Can't Happen Here (1935), which portrays an American dictatorship and is quoted frequently throughout the book.